"Freshmint!" is a song by Australian rock band Regurgitator. The song was released in March 2000 as the third and final single from the band's third studio album ...art. The single peaked at number 44 in Australia.

Track listings

Charts

Release history

References

 

2000 singles
1999 songs
Regurgitator songs
Songs written by Quan Yeomans
Song recordings produced by Magoo (Australian producer)
Warner Music Australasia singles